14N may refer to:
 Gnome-Rhône 14N, a World War II French 14-cylinder two-row air-cooled radial engine
 Kodak DCS Pro 14n, a 2002 professional F-mount digital SLR camera
 Nitrogen-14 (14N), an isotope of nitrogen

See also
 N14 (disambiguation)